Belgium competed at the 1924 Winter Olympics in Chamonix, France.

Medalists

Bobsleigh

Figure skating

Men

Pairs

Ice hockey

Group B
The top two teams (highlighted) advanced to the medal round.

Speed skating

Men

All-round 
Distances: 500m; 5000m; 1500m & 10,000m.

References

Olympic Winter Games 1924, full results by sports-reference.com

Nations at the 1924 Winter Olympics
1924
Olympics, Winter